In mathematics, a collocation method is a method for the numerical solution of ordinary differential equations, partial differential equations and integral equations. The idea is to choose a finite-dimensional space of candidate solutions (usually polynomials up to a certain degree) and a number of points in the domain (called collocation points), and to select that solution which satisfies the given equation at the collocation points.

Ordinary differential equations 

Suppose that the ordinary differential equation

is to be solved over the interval . Choose  from 0 ≤ c1< c2< … < cn ≤ 1.

The corresponding (polynomial) collocation method approximates the solution y by the polynomial p of degree n which satisfies the initial condition , and the differential equation 

This gives n + 1 conditions, which matches the n + 1 parameters needed to specify a polynomial of degree n.

All these collocation methods are in fact implicit Runge–Kutta methods. The coefficients ck in the Butcher tableau of a Runge–Kutta method are the collocation points. However, not all implicit Runge–Kutta methods are collocation methods.

Example: The trapezoidal rule 
Pick, as an example, the two collocation points c1 = 0 and c2 = 1 (so n = 2). The collocation conditions are

There are three conditions, so p should be a polynomial of degree 2. Write p in the form

to simplify the computations. Then the collocation conditions can be solved to give the coefficients

The collocation method is now given (implicitly) by

where y1 = p(t0 + h) is the approximate solution at t = t0 + h.

This method is known as the "trapezoidal rule" for differential equations. Indeed, this method can also be derived by rewriting the differential equation as

and approximating the integral on the right-hand side by the trapezoidal rule for integrals.

Other examples 

The Gauss–Legendre methods use the points of Gauss–Legendre quadrature as collocation points. The Gauss–Legendre method based on s points has order 2s. All Gauss–Legendre methods are A-stable.

In fact, one can show that the order of a collocation method corresponds to the order of the quadrature rule that one would get using the collocation points as weights.

Orthogonal collocation method 
In direct collocation method, we are essentially performing variational calculus with the finite-dimensional subspace of piecewise linear functions (as in trapezoidal rule), or cubic functions, or other piecewise polynomial functions. In orthogonal collocation method, we instead use the finite-dimensional subspace spanned by the first N vectors in some orthogonal polynomial basis, such as the Legendre polynomials.

Notes

References 
 .
 .
 .
 .

Curve fitting
Numerical differential equations